Tukkuguda is a municipality in Rangareddy district, Telangana, India. It falls under Maheswaram mandal.

It is 27 kilometers away from Hyderabad. The Outer Ring Road, Hyderabad has a major junction passing through this village.
Rajiv Gandhi International Airport is 7 kilometers away. The Ayyappa temple is located in the village. Around 50000 to 100000 people live here as per 2023 census.

References

Villages in Ranga Reddy district